Gas analysis may refer to:

 Blood gas analysis, a method that measures arterial oxygen tension, carbon dioxide tension, and other aspects of a blood sample
 Breath gas analysis, a non-invasive method that measures volatile organic compounds present in the exhaled breath
 Dissolved gas analysis, a method that measures dissolved gases in insulating fluids
 Evolved gas analysis, a method that measures the gas evolved from a heated sample that undergoes decomposition or desorption
 Breathing gas analysis, especially for breathing gas mixtures
 Trace gas analysis, as an application of mass spectrometry, ion-mobility spectrometry or a combination of the two methods

Gas analyzer may refer to:
 Infrared gas analyzer
 Residual gas analyzer
 Orsat gas analyser
 Thermal and Evolved Gas Analyzer, a scientific instrument aboard the Phoenix spacecraft
 Helium analyzer, an instrument to measure the concentration of helium in a gas mixture
 Electro-galvanic oxygen sensor, an device which consumes a fuel to produce an electrical output by a chemical reaction